The 2020–21 Miami Heat season was the 33rd season of the franchise in the National Basketball Association (NBA).

The Heat entered the season as both the defending Southeast Division and Eastern Conference champions. The season began just 72 days after the completion of the 2020 Finals, giving the Heat and the Los Angeles Lakers the shortest off-season in league history. With a win over the Boston Celtics 129-121, the Heat returned to the playoffs for the second straight year on May 11. They attempted to make back-to-back NBA Finals appearances for the first time since 2013 and 2014, but fell to the eventual champion Milwaukee Bucks in the first round in a four-game sweep in a rematch of last season's Conference Semifinals in which the Heat won in five games. This is the first time that the Heat were swept in the playoffs since 2007 which was also in the first round against the Chicago Bulls. It was also the first time since 2014 that Andre Iguodala missed the NBA Finals. Iguodala would return to the Golden State Warriors the following season after two seasons with the Heat.

Draft picks

Roster

Standings

Division

Conference

Notes
 z – Clinched home court advantage for the entire playoffs
 c – Clinched home court advantage for the conference playoffs
 y – Clinched division title
 x – Clinched playoff spot
 pb – Clinched play-in spot
 o – Eliminated from playoff contention
 * – Division leader

Game log

Preseason 

|-style="background:#fcc;"
| 1
| December 14
| New Orleans
| 
| Tyler Herro (17)
| Max Strus (8)
| Bam Adebayo (8)
| American Airlines Arena
| 0–1
|-style="background:#cfc;"
| 2
| December 18
| @ Toronto
| 
| KZ Okpala (24)
| Precious Achiuwa (15)
| Goran Dragić (8)
| Amalie Arena
| 1–1

Regular season 

|-style="background:#fcc;"
| 1
| December 23
| @ Orlando
| 
| Bam Adebayo (25)
| Bam Adebayo (11)
| Butler, Dragić (7)
| Amway Center3,396
| 0–1
|-style="background:#cfc;"
| 2
| December 25
| New Orleans
| 
| Duncan Robinson (23)
| Andre Iguodala (7)
| Goran Dragić (9)
| American Airlines Arena0
| 1–1
|-style="background:#fcc;"
| 3
| December 29
| Milwaukee
| 
| Tyler Herro (23)
| Bam Adebayo (6)
| Tyler Herro (7)
| American Airlines ArenaLimited seating
| 1–2
|-style="background:#cfc;"
| 4
| December 30
| Milwaukee
| 
| Goran Dragić (26)
| Tyler Herro (15)
| Bam Adebayo (10)
| American Airlines ArenaLimited seating
| 2–2

|-style="background:#fcc;"
| 5
| January 1
| @ Dallas
| 
| Bam Adebayo (19)
| Bam Adebayo (11)
| Goran Dragić (7)
| American Airlines Center0
| 2–3
|-style="background:#cfc;"
| 6
| January 4
| Oklahoma City
| 
| Bam Adebayo (20)
| Tyler Herro (9)
| Tyler Herro (8)
| American Airlines ArenaLimited seating
| 3–3
|-style="background:#fcc;"
| 7
| January 6
| Boston
| 
| Jimmy Butler (26)
| Adebayo, Butler (8)
| Bam Adebayo (10)
| American Airlines ArenaLimited seating
| 3–4
|-style="background:#cfc;"
| 8
| January 9
| @ Washington
| 
| Tyler Herro (31)
| Bam Adebayo (16)
| Jimmy Butler (9)
| Capital One Arena0
| 4–4
|-style="background:#ccc;"
| –
| January 10
| @ Boston
| colspan="6" | Postponed (COVID-19) (Makeup date: May 11)
|-style="background:#fcc;"
| 9
| January 12
| @ Philadelphia
| 
| Tyler Herro (34)
| Precious Achiuwa (13)
| Andre Iguodala (7)
| Wells Fargo Center0
| 4–5
|-style="background:#fcc;"
| 10
| January 14
| @ Philadelphia
| 
| Duncan Robinson (22)
| Precious Achiuwa (11)
| Vincent, Iguodala (8)
| Wells Fargo Center0
| 4–6
|-style="background:#fcc;"
| 11
| January 16
| Detroit
| 
| Bam Adebayo (28)
| Bam Adebayo (7)
| Goran Dragić (7)
| American Airlines ArenaLimited seating
| 4–7
|-style="background:#cfc;"
| 12
| January 18
| Detroit
| 
| Bam Adebayo (28)
| Bam Adebayo (11)
| Bam Adebayo (5)
| American Airlines ArenaLimited seating
| 5–7
|-style="background:#cfc;"
| 13
| January 20
| @ Toronto
| 
| Kendrick Nunn (28)
| Bam Adebayo (13)
| Kelly Olynyk (8)
| Amalie Arena0
| 6–7
|-style="background:#fcc;"
| 14
| January 22
| @ Toronto
| 
| Kendrick Nunn (22)
| Bam Adebayo (8)
| Kendrick Nunn (5)
| Amalie Arena0
| 6–8
|-style="background:#fcc;"
| 15
| January 23
| @ Brooklyn
| 
| Bam Adebayo (41)
| Kelly Olynyk (6)
| Iguodala, Olynyk (3)
| Barclays Center0
| 6–9
|-style="background:#fcc;"
| 16
| January 25
| @ Brooklyn
| 
| Bam Adebayo (26)
| Bam Adebayo (10)
| Adebayo, Dragić (5)
| Barclays Center0
| 6–10
|-style="background:#fcc;"
| 17
| January 27
| Denver
| 
| Bam Adebayo (15)
| Bam Adebayo (7)
| Bam Adebayo (6)
| American Airlines ArenaLimited seating
| 6–11
|-style="background:#fcc;"
| 18
| January 28
| L. A. Clippers
| 
| Tyler Herro (19)
| Bam Adebayo (13)
| Bam Adebayo (7)
| American Airlines ArenaLimited seating
| 6–12
|-style="background:#cfc;"
| 19
| January 30
| Sacramento
| 
| Jimmy Butler (30)
| Bam Adebayo (13)
| Jimmy Butler (8)
| American Airlines ArenaLimited seating
| 7–12

|-style="background:#fcc;"
| 20
| February 1
| Charlotte
| 
| Jimmy Butler (25)
| Adebayo, Butler (9)
| Dragić, Herro (8)
| American Airlines ArenaLimited seating
| 7–13
|-style="background:#fcc;"
| 21
| February 3
| Washington
| 
| Tyler Herro (20)
| Adebayo, Olynyk (11)
| Jimmy Butler (9)
| American Airlines ArenaLimited seating
| 7–14
|-style="background:#cfc;"
| 22
| February 5
| Washington
| 
| Kendrick Nunn (25)
| Andre Iguodala (10)
| Jimmy Butler (9)
| American Airlines ArenaLimited seating
| 8–14
|-style="background:#cfc;"
| 23
| February 7
| @ New York
| 
| Bam Adebayo (24)
| Bam Adebayo (11)
| Jimmy Butler (9)
| Madison Square Garden0
| 9–14
|-style="background:#cfc;"
| 24
| February 9
| New York
| 
| Jimmy Butler (26)
| Jimmy Butler (8)
| Jimmy Butler (10)
| American Airlines ArenaLimited seating
| 10–14
|-style="background:#cfc;"
| 25
| February 11
| @ Houston
| 
| Jimmy Butler (27)
| Adebayo, Olynyk (13)
| Jimmy Butler (10)
| AT&T Center3,251
| 11–14
|-style="background:#fcc;"
| 26
| February 13
| @ Utah
| 
| Kendrick Nunn (23)
| Adebayo, Olynyk (10)
| Adebayo, Herro (6)
| Vivint Arena3,902
| 11–15
|-style="background:#fcc;"
| 27
| February 15
| @ L. A. Clippers
| 
| Bam Adebayo (27)
| Bam Adebayo (12)
| Jimmy Butler (10)
| Staples Center0
| 11–16
|-style="background:#fcc;"
| 28
| February 17
| @ Golden State
| 
| Bam Adebayo (24)
| Tyler Herro (15)
| Jimmy Butler (11)
| Chase Center0
| 11–17
|-style="background:#cfc;"
| 29
| February 18
| @ Sacramento
| 
| Tyler Herro (27)
| Bam Adebayo (12)
| Bam Adebayo (10)
| Golden 1 Center0
| 12–17
|-style="background:#cfc;"
| 30
| February 20
| @ L. A. Lakers
| 
| Kendrick Nunn (27)
| Adebayo, Robinson (10)
| Bam Adebayo (6)
| Staples Center0
| 13–17
|-style="background:#cfc;"
| 31
| February 22
| @ Oklahoma City
| 
| Duncan Robinson (22)
| Bam Adebayo (13)
| Butler, Nunn (9)
| Chesapeake Energy Arena0
| 14–17
|-style="background:#cfc;"
| 32
| February 24
| Toronto
| 
| Jimmy Butler (27)
| Bam Adebayo (12)
| Jimmy Butler (10)
| American Airlines ArenaLimited seating
| 15–17
|-style="background:#cfc;"
| 33
| February 26
| Utah
| 
| Jimmy Butler (33)
| Bam Adebayo (11)
| Jimmy Butler (8)
| American Airlines ArenaLimited seating
| 16–17
|-style="background:#cfc;"
| 34 
| February 28
| Atlanta
| 
| Kendrick Nunn (24)
| Bam Adebayo (13)
| Kendrick Nunn (7)
| American Airlines ArenaLimited seating
| 17–17

|-style="background:#fcc;"
| 35
| March 2
| Atlanta
| 
| Dragić, Robinson (14)
| Kelly Olynyk (6)
| Goran Dragić (4)
| American Airlines ArenaLimited seating
| 17–18
|-style="background:#cfc;"
| 36
| March 4
| @ New Orleans
| 
| Jimmy Butler (29)
| Kelly Olynyk (10)
| Jimmy Butler (9)
| Smoothie King Center2,700
| 18–18
|-style="background:#cfc;"
| 37
| March 11
| Orlando
| 
| Jimmy Butler (27)
| Jimmy Butler (8)
| Jimmy Butler (11)
| American Airlines ArenaLimited seating
| 19–18
|-style="background:#cfc;"
| 38
| March 12
| @ Chicago
| 
| Jimmy Butler (28)
| Goran Dragić (7)
| Jimmy Butler (8)
| United Center0
| 20–18
|-style="background:#cfc;"
| 39
| March 14
| @ Orlando
| 
| Jimmy Butler (22)
| Butler, Olynyk (7)
| Jimmy Butler (9)
| Amway Center3,264
| 21–18
|-style="background:#cfc;"
| 40
| March 16
| Cleveland
| 
| Jimmy Butler (28)
| Jimmy Butler (12)
| Goran Dragić (9)
| American Airlines ArenaLimited seating
| 22–18
|-style="background:#fcc;"
| 41
| March 17
| @ Memphis
| 
| Jimmy Butler (24)
| Bam Adebayo (12)
| Bam Adebayo (6)
| FedExForum2,217
| 22–19
|-style="background:#fcc;"
| 42
| March 19
| Indiana
| 
| Bam Adebayo (20)
| Adebayo, Butler (8)
| Bam Adebayo (5)
| American Airlines ArenaLimited seating
| 22–20
|-style="background:#fcc;"
| 43
| March 21
| Indiana
| 
| Bam Adebayo (9)
| Jimmy Butler (15)
| Jimmy Butler (7)
| American Airlines ArenaLimited seating
| 22–21
|-style="background:#fcc;"
| 44
| March 23
| Phoenix
| 
| Kendrick Nunn (25)
| Jimmy Butler (11)
| Bam Adebayo (6)
| American Airlines ArenaLimited seating
| 22–22
|-style="background:#fcc;"
| 45
| March 25
| Portland
| 
| Bam Adebayo (29)
| Bam Adebayo (7)
| Bam Adebayo (9)
| American Airlines ArenaLimited seating
| 22–23
|-style="background:#fcc;"
| 46
| March 26
| @ Charlotte
| 
| Butler, Robinson (20)
| Trevor Ariza (9)
| Jimmy Butler (9)
| Spectrum Center4,215
| 22–24
|-style="background:#cfc;"
| 47
| March 29
| @ New York
| 
| Jimmy Butler (27)
| Bam Adebayo (17)
| Jimmy Butler (6)
| Madison Square Garden1,981
| 23–24
|-style="background:#cfc;"
| 48
| March 31
| @ Indiana
| 
| Duncan Robinson (20)
| Adebayo, Robinson (8)
| Bam Adebayo (7)
| Bankers Life Fieldhouse0
| 24–24

|-style="background:#cfc;"
| 49
| April 1
| Golden State
| 
| Jimmy Butler (22)
| Bam Adebayo (8)
| Jimmy Butler (8)
| American Airlines ArenaLimited seating
| 25–24
|-style="background:#cfc;"
| 50
| April 3
| Cleveland
| 
| Adebayo, Robinson (18)
| Bam Adebayo (11)
| Jimmy Butler (11)
| American Airlines ArenaLimited seating
| 26–24
|-style="background:#fcc;"
| 51
| April 6
| Memphis
| 
| Jimmy Butler (28)
| Bam Adebayo (10)
| Bam Adebayo (10)
| American Airlines ArenaLimited seating
| 26–25
|-style="background:#cfc;"
| 52
| April 8
| L. A. Lakers
| 
| Jimmy Butler (28)
| Adebayo, Butler (7)
| Jimmy Butler (5)
| American Airlines ArenaLimited seating
| 27–25
|-style="background:#cfc;"
| 53
| April 11
| @ Portland
| 
| Bam Adebayo (22)
| Tyler Herro (7)
| Jimmy Butler (5)
| Moda Center0
| 28–25
|-style="background:#fcc;"
| 54
| April 13
| @ Phoenix
| 
| Jimmy Butler (18)
| Bam Adebayo (10)
| Jimmy Butler (8)
| Phoenix Suns Arena5,024
| 28–26
|-style="background:#fcc;"
| 55
| April 14
| @ Denver
| 
| Bam Adebayo (21)
| Bam Adebayo (6)
| Jimmy Butler (9)
| Ball Arena4,017
| 28–27
|-style="background:#fcc;"
| 56
| April 16
| @ Minnesota
| 
| Jimmy Butler (30)
| Jimmy Butler (10)
| Jimmy Butler (8)
| Target Center1,638
| 28–28
|-style="background:#cfc;"
| 57
| April 18
| Brooklyn
| 
| Bam Adebayo (21)
| Bam Adebayo (15)
| Goran Dragić (7)
| American Airlines ArenaLimited seating
| 29–28
|-style="background:#cfc;"
| 58
| April 19
| Houston
| 
| Kendrick Nunn (30)
| Precious Achiuwa (11)
| Kendrick Nunn (8)
| American Airlines ArenaLimited seating
| 30–28
|-style="background:#cfc;"
| 59
| April 21
| @ San Antonio
| 
| Bam Adebayo (23)
| Bam Adebayo (8)
| Jimmy Butler (11)
| AT&T Center4,229
| 31–28
|-style="background:#fcc;"
| 60
| April 23
| @ Atlanta
| 
| Kendrick Nunn (21)
| Trevor Ariza (10)
| Jimmy Butler (7)
| State Farm Arena2,985
| 31–29
|-style="background:#cfc;"
| 61
| April 24
| Chicago
| 
| Duncan Robinson (23)
| Adebayo, Dedmon, Robinson (10)
| Bam Adebayo (10)
| American Airlines ArenaLimited seating
| 32–29
|-style="background:#fcc;"
| 62
| April 26
| Chicago
| 
| Jimmy Butler (33)
| Jimmy Butler (8)
| Goran Dragić (7)
| American Airlines ArenaLimited seating
| 32–30
|-style="background:#cfc;"
| 63
| April 28
| San Antonio
| 
| Jimmy Butler (29)
| Bam Adebayo (11)
| Goran Dragić (7)
| American Airlines ArenaLimited seating
| 33–30

|-style="background:#cfc;"
| 64
| May 1
| @ Cleveland
| 
| Kendrick Nunn (22)
| Bam Adebayo (10)
| Goran Dragić (7)
| Rocket Mortgage FieldHouse 4,148
| 34–30
|-style="background:#cfc;" 
| 65
| May 2
| @ Charlotte
| 
| Bam Adebayo (20)
| Jimmy Butler (8)
| Bam Adebayo (10)
| Spectrum Center4,095
| 35–30
|-style="background:#fcc;"
| 66
| May 4
| Dallas
| 
| Duncan Robinson (19)
| Duncan Robinson (9)
| Bam Adebayo (11)
| American Airlines ArenaLimited seating 
| 35–31
|-style="background:#cfc;"
| 67 
| May 7
| Minnesota
| 
| Tyler Herro (27)
| Jimmy Butler (8)
| Jimmy Butler 6)
| American Airlines ArenaLimited seating 
| 36–31
|-style="background:#cfc;"
| 68
| May 9
| @ Boston
| 
| Jimmy Butler (26)
| Jimmy Butler (8)
| Jimmy Butler (11)
| TD Garden2,298
| 37–31
|-style="background:#cfc;"
| 69
| May 11
| @ Boston
| 
| Tyler Herro (24)
| Tyler Herro (11)
| Bam Adebayo (5)
| TD Garden4,789
| 38–31
|-style="background:#cfc;"
| 70
| May 13
| Philadelphia
| 
| Jimmy Butler (21)
| Bam Adebayo (12)
| Bam Adebayo (8)
| American Airlines ArenaLimited seating
| 39–31
|-style="background:#fcc;"
| 71
| May 15
| @ Milwaukee
| 
| Kendrick Nunn (31)
| Bam Adebayo (8)
| Bam Adebayo (8)
| Fiserv Forum3,280
| 39–32
|-style="background:#cfc;"
| 72
| May 16
| @ Detroit
| 
| Precious Achiuwa (23)
| Precious Achiuwa (10)
| Tyler Herro (11)
| Little Caesars Arena750
| 40–32

Playoffs 

|-style="background:#fcc;"
| 1
| May 22
| @ Milwaukee
| 
| Goran Dragić (25)
| Bam Adebayo (12)
| Jimmy Butler (8)
| Fiserv Forum9,107
| 0–1
|-style="background:#fcc;"
| 2
| May 24
| @ Milwaukee
| 
| Dewayne Dedmon (19)
| Dewayne Dedmon (9)
| Adebayo, Butler, Dragić (4)
| Fiserv Forum9,107
| 0–2
|-style="background:#fcc;"
| 3
| May 27
| Milwaukee
| 
| Jimmy Butler (19)
| Adebayo, Butler (8)
| Jimmy Butler (6)
| American Airlines Arena17,000
| 0–3
|-style="background:#fcc;"
| 4
| May 29
| Milwaukee
| 
| Bam Adebayo (20)
| Bam Adebayo (14)
| Jimmy Butler (10)
| American Airlines Arena17,000
| 0–4

Transactions

Re-signed

Additions

Subtractions

Notes

References

Miami Heat seasons
Miami Heat
Miami Heat
Miami Heat